Three Great Noodles of Morioka is a term to describe the noodle dishes Morioka Reimen, morioka Jajamen, and wanko soba of the city of Morioka, Iwate Prefecture, Japan  .

Morioka Reimen is a cold noodle dish based on Korean naengmyeon.
Morioka Jajamen is a dish with meat miso on thin udon noodles, based on Chinese zhajiangmian.
Wanko soba is a style of Japanese soba, served in many small bite-sized bowls.

References

Food and drink culture
 Japanese cuisine
 Noodle dishes
 Morioka, Iwate
 Soba
 Udon